Farrokh or Farokh (meaning fortunate and happy), also transliterated as Farrukh, is a popular masculine given name of Persian origin and also a common surname in Iran, Central Asia and among Muslims and Zoroastrians in South Asia. Some prominent individuals with the name include:

People with the mononym
Farrukh Beg (c. 1545 – c. 1615), a Persian born Mughal painter
Farrukh Pasha, a 16th and 17th-century Ottoman statesman based in Palestine
Farrukh-Shah (died 1196), the amir of Kerman, in southeast of Iran from 1195 until his death

People with the given name

Farokh
Farokh Engineer (born 1938), Indian cricketer
Farokh Udwadia, Indian physician

Farrokh
Ahmad-i Farrokh, a 12th-century Persian physician
Farrokh Khan also known by his title of Amin od-dowleh, was a high-ranking Persian official, and vice premier to the court of shah Fath-Ali Shah Qajar
Farrokh Ayazi, American Iranian professor and electrical engineer 
Farrokh Bulsara (1946-1991), known as Freddie Mercury, a British rock musician and founding member of the band Queen
Farrokh Ghaffari (1921–2006), an Iranian film director, actor, critic and author
Farrokh Khambata, an Indian entrepreneur, restaurateur, chef and caterer.
Farrokh Negahdar, an Iranian political activist
Farrokh Saidi (born 1929), Iranian surgeon, academician

Farukh
Farukh Ruzimatov (born 1963), Russian ballet dancer

Farrukh
Farrukh Ahmad (1918–1974), a Bangladeshi poet
Farrukh Amonatov (born 1978), a Tajik chess player
Farrukh Bari (born 1964), a Pakistani cricketer
Farrukh Choriyev (born 1984), Tajik football player
Farrukh Dhondy, a British writer
Farrukh Dustov (born 1986), an Uzbek tennis player
Farrukh Fateh Ali Khan (1952–2003), Pakistani Punjabi player of the harmonium in Qawwali and a member of a well-known family of Qawwali musicians
Farrukh Gayibov (1891–1916), a Russian pilot of Azerbaijani ancestry, and participant in World War I
Farrukh Habib, a Pakistani politician 
Farrukh Hormizd, army chief (spahbed) of northern Iran during the late Sasanian period
Farrukh Ismayilov (born 1978), an Azerbaijani footballer 
Farrukh Javed, a Pakistani politician
Farrukh Khan, Pakistani politician
Farrukh Quraishi, a retired Iranian-American football player
Farrukh Raza (born 1961), a Pakistani former cricketer
Farrukh Saleem, Pakistani political scientist, economist, financial analyst, journalist and a television personality
Farrukh Sayfiev (born 1991), Uzbek footballer
Farrukh Yassar, the Shirvanshah (king of Shirvan, r. 1465–1500)
Farrukh Zokirov, an Uzbek composer, singer and artistic director of the famous in ex-USSR band Yalla
Farrukh Zaman (born 1956), Pakistani cricketer
Muhammad Farrukh Irfan Khan (born 1958), Pakistani Justice of the Lahore High Court

People with the surname

Farrokh
Kaveh Farrokh (born 1962), a Canadian author of Iranian descent

Farrukh
Bushra Farrukh (born 1957), a Pakistani poet

See also
 Farrokh (disambiguation)
 Farrokhroo Parsa (1922–1980), Iranian politician
 Farooq, a given name and surname